Paul Mercier (26 July 1924 – 7 August 2013) was a member of the House of Commons of Canada from 1993 to 2000. By career, he was a professor and businessman.

Born in Brussels, Belgium, he was elected in the Blainville—Deux-Montagnes electoral district under the Bloc Québécois party in the 1993 federal election. He was re-elected in Terrebonne—Blainville riding in the 1997 federal election. He served in the 35th and 36th Canadian Parliaments and left Canadian politics in 2000 without seeking a third term in Parliament.

From 1977 to 1993, Mercier served as Mayor of Blainville. He died 7 August 2013.

Mercier served in the Belgian Army from 1944 to 1945.

References

External links
 

1924 births
2013 deaths
Belgian expatriates in Canada
Bloc Québécois MPs
Mayors of places in Quebec
Members of the House of Commons of Canada from Quebec
People from Blainville, Quebec
Politicians from Brussels
Belgian military personnel of World War II